W spodniach czy w sukience? is the third studio album by Polish singer Ania, released in 2008.

Background 
The album continued the retro-inspired theme from Ania's previous record, with sleeve photos and arrangements reminiscenting 1950s and 1960s style. The album's title translates In Trousers or in Dress?.

W spodniach czy w sukience? managed to repeat the success of two previous albums. It reached #1 in Polish albums chart and received mostly positive feedback from music critics. The album spawned two hit singles: "Nigdy więcej nie tańcz ze mną" and the title track. Three months after its release, W spodniach czy w sukience? was certified Platinum.

Track listing 
 "Turu tu tu..." - 3:40
 "Smutek mam we krwi" - 3:31
 "W spodniach czy w sukience" - 5:18
 "Nigdy więcej nie tańcz ze mną" - 2:58
 "Znowu przyszło lato" - 3:38
 "Póki mi starczy sił" - 5:01
 "Bardzo lubię opowiadania o miłości" - 2:48
 "Jesteś jak sen o spadaniu" - 3:08
 "Ciągle mylę cię z nim" - 5:05
 "Zmieniaj mnie gdy zechcesz" - 4:22

Singles 
 2008: "Nigdy więcej nie tańcz ze mną"
 2008: "W spodniach czy w sukience"
 2009: "Smutek mam we krwi"

References 

2008 albums
Ania (singer) albums